Titles is the debut solo studio album by the English new wave artist Mick Karn, released in 1982. The album peaked at #74 on the UK Album Chart.

History
Titles was released in November 1982, shortly after Karn's band Japan had announced their intention to split up. Karn recorded the album in London during July and August 1982, and Japan drummer Steve Jansen and keyboard player Richard Barbieri both worked as session musicians on the album.

The track "Sensitive" is a reworking of the Roberto Carlos song "À Distância" (both Carlos and Karn are credited as writers). It was originally produced by Karn with Ricky Wilde and released as a single in June 1982, though failed to chart. A new version of the track was recorded for the album, and it was re-released as a single in January 1983 when it peaked at #98.

Track listing
All compositions by Mick Karn except where noted.
Side one
 "Tribal Dawn" 4:10
 "Lost Affections in a Room" 4:17
 "Passion in Moisture" 4:12
 "Weather the Windmill" 3:54

Side two
 "Saviour, Are You With Me?" (trad., arr by Mick Karn) 4:05
 "Trust Me" 4:57
 "Sensitive" (Roberto Carlos, Mick Karn) 4:35
 "Piper Blue" 4:21

Bonus track on 1990 CD release
 "The Sound of Waves" 6:11

"The Sound of Waves" had been previously issued as the B-side to the album's only single release, "Sensitive".

Personnel
 Mick Karn – fretless bass, saxophone, clarinet, bassoon, ocarinas, recorder (tracks 3 and 8), African flute (tracks 3 and 7), percussion (except track 7), keyboards, vocals, drum machine (tracks 3, 6, and 8), keyboard programming (tracks 4 and 8), producer
 Richard Barbieri – keyboard programming (except tracks 4 and 8)
 Hugh Burns – guitar (track 5)
 Colin Fairley – percussion (track 1), producer, engineer, remixing
 David Jacobs – assistant engineer
 Steve Jansen – congas (track 1), cymbal (track 7)
 David Rhodes – guitar (track 6)
 Tim Summerhays – engineer
 Angie Usher – vocals (track 5)
 Ricky Wilde – keyboards (track 7), drum machine (track 7), producer, mixing

References

1982 debut albums
Virgin Records albums